Kyiv Oblast or Kiev Oblast, also called Kyivshchyna, is an oblast (province) in central and northern Ukraine. It surrounds, but does not include, the city of Kyiv, which is administered as a city with special status, though Kyiv also serves as the administrative center of the oblast. The Kyiv metropolitan area extends out from Kyiv city into parts of the oblast, which is significantly dependent on the urban economy and transportation of Kyiv.

The population of Kyiv Oblast is  Its largest city is Bila Tserkva, with a population over 200,000.

The Chernobyl Exclusion Zone is in the northern part of Kyiv Oblast. It is administered separately from the oblast and public access is prohibited.

History 
Kyiv Oblast was created as part of the Ukrainian Soviet Socialist Republic on February 27, 1932 among the first five original oblasts in Ukraine. It was established on territory that had been known as Ruthenian land.

Earlier historical administrative units that became the territory of the oblast include the Kiev Voivodeship under the Polish–Lithuanian Commonwealth and Grand Duchy of Lithuania, and the Kiev Viceroyalty and Kiev Governorate under the Russian Empire. The northern part of the oblast belongs to the historical region of Polesia (Polissia).

In Kyiv region, there was a specific folk icon-painting style much influenced by the Kyiv Pechersk Lavra painting school. Saints were depicted on the deep purple or black background, their clothes dark, their haloes dark blue, dark green or even black, outlined by thin white dotted contours. The Kyiv region's icons collection is the part of the exhibition of the Museum of Ukrainian home icons in the Historical and cultural complex "The Radomysl Castle".

The current borders of the oblast were set following the Chernobyl disaster in 1986. Administrative oversight of the new city of Slavutych, which was constructed as part of the Chernihiv Oblast, was then transferred to the Kyiv Oblast (see Chernobyl zone below).

On 24 February 2022, Russian Armed Forces invaded Kyiv Oblast as part of its 2022 Russian invasion of Ukraine. Ukraine launched a counter-offensive to retake the region in March 2022. The oblast was declared free of invaders on 2 April 2022 by the Ukrainian Deputy Minister of Defense Hanna Malyar. According to the Ukrainian Ministry of Defense its troops had retaken more than 30 towns and villages around Kyiv. However, on April 9, 2022 the Russians attacked the Oblast again, even destroying a railway station in Bucha.

Geography 
On the west it borders the Zhytomyr Oblast, on the southwest – Vinnytsia Oblast, on the south – Cherkasy Oblast, on the southeast – Poltava Oblast, on the east and northeast – Chernihiv Oblast, and on the north – Homyel Voblasts of Belarus.

The oblast is equally split between both banks of the Dnieper River (Dnipro) north and south of Kyiv. Other significant rivers in the oblast are the Dnieper's tributaries: Pripyat (Prypiat) (R), Desna (L), Teteriv (R), Irpin' (R), Ros' (R) and Trubizh (L).

The length of the Dnipro River within the boundaries of the oblast totals . The oblast has a total number of 177 rivers intersecting the region; 13 reservoirs (the most notable ones being Kyiv Reservoir and the Kaniv Reservoir), over 2000 ponds, and approximately 750 small lakes.

Climate 

The climate of Kyiv Oblast is characteristic of the Polesia area and other neighboring forested areas. The oblast has a moderately continental climate with relatively mild winters and warm summers.

Vegetation 

Kyiv Oblast has small mountains and slopes on the right bank of the Dnieper River. This entire area is surrounded by a continuous belt by greenery and forests.

Points of interest 
The following historic-cultural sites were nominated for the Seven Wonders of Ukraine.
 Pereiaslav museum of folk architecture
 Liutych platzdarm
 Ivan Kozlovsky villa
 Dobranychivka settlement
 Saint Pokrov Church (Parkhomivka)
 Museum-villa of Ekaterina Bilokur
 Landscape garden Oleksandria

Administrative divisions 

The oblast is divided into 7 raions.

Before the July 2020 reform, the oblast was subdivided into 25 raions (administrative districts). It consists of 26 cities, 30 towns, and more than 1,000 villages.

The following data incorporates the number of each type of administrative divisions of Kyiv Oblast:

 Administrative Center – 1 (Kyiv)
 Raions – 25;
 Settlements – 1183, including:
 Villages – 1127;
 Cities/Towns – 56, including:
 Urban-type settlement – 30;
 Cities – 25, including:
 Cities of oblast' subordinance – 13;
 Cities of raion subordinance – 14;
 Selsoviets – 605.

As with other oblasts of Ukraine, the head of the Kyiv Oblast State Administration (governor) is appointed by the President of Ukraine and subordinated to the Cabinet of Ministers of Ukraine. Local self-government body is the popularly elected Kyiv Oblast Rada, chaired by a Speaker (elected from among the councilors).

The "exclaves" 
The municipality of Slavutych is within the borders of the neighboring Chernihiv Oblast on the eastern bank of the Dnieper river and the municipality has no common border with the Kyiv Oblast. Still, Slavutych is administrated by the Kyiv Oblast authorities (being a kind of administrative exclave).

Similarly, the town of Kotsiubynske, which is within the borders of Kyiv city (which is surrounded by the Kyiv Oblast), is administrated by the Irpin city council.

Chernobyl zone 

The north-western end of the oblast is a part of the Chernobyl Exclusion Zone due to the radioactive contamination caused by the Chernobyl nuclear reactor accident. The largest cities within zone are Chernobyl and Prypiat, which are now abandoned. The city of Slavutych was built outside of the zone to host evacuated residents of Prypyat and personnel of the zone installations.

Important cities and towns 
Important cities and towns of Kyiv Oblast include:

Biggest settlements (population in thousands)
 Bila Tserkva – 200.1
 Brovary – 86.8
 Boryspil – 54.0 (not counting two subordinated villages)
 Fastiv – 52.0
 Irpin – 40.6 (not counting four subordinated towns)

Governors 
Vira Ulianchenko
Viktor Vakarsh (acting) May 2009 – ?
Anatoliy Prysyazhnyuk
Volodymyr Shandra (2014–2016)
Maksym Melnychuk (February until September 2016)

Demographics 
Kyiv Oblast's largest nationality group are Ukrainians (1,684,800 people, or 92.5%), followed by Russians, Jews, Belarusians, Poles, and others. The current estimated population (excluding Kyiv) is around 1.72 million (as of 2013). The population density is 63.01/km2.

The urban population, according to the 2001 Ukrainian Census data, accounted for 1,053,500 people, or 57.6%, and the rural population – for 774,400 people, or 42.4%.

According to the data, the number of men accounted for 845,900 people, or 46.3%, that of women – 982,000 people, or 53.7%.

Age structure 
 0-14 years: 14.9%  (male 132,559/female 123,816)
 15-64 years: 69.8%  (male 576,559/female 621,753)
 65 years and over: 15.3%  (male 84,026/female 177,360) (2013 official)

Median age 
 total: 39.7 years 
 male: 36.3 years 
 female: 43.0 years  (2013 official)

Age structure of Kyiv City 
 0-14 years: 14.1%  (male 203,453/female 192,111)
 15-64 years: 73.3%  (male 962,391/female 1,093,183)
 65 years and over: 12.6%  (male 129,293/female 223,285) (2013 official)

Median age of Kyiv City 
 total: 37.6 years 
 male: 35.4 years 
 female: 39.9 years  (2013 official)

Economy

Industry 
Kyiv Oblast's main industry's include: power production, food, chemical and petrochemical industries, mechanical engineering and metal-working. The national share of tire production for automobiles constitutes – 63%, excavators – 53%, paper and cardboard – 40%, hoisting cranes – 39%. In general, the oblast has 330 licensed industrial enterprises and 742 smaller industrial enterprises. The Boryspil Bus Plant in Prolisky produces 1,700 buses per year of various modifications, and several other auto-industry factories are also located in the oblast'.

Agriculture 
In addition to industry, the oblast also has a developed agriculture production. In 1999, the gross grain yield in the region was about 1,118,600 tons, sugar-beets – 1,570,900 tons, sunflower seeds – 18,1 thousand tons, potatoes – 669,200 tons. The region also produced 156,900 tons of meat, 738,500 tons of milk and 855,2 million eggs. At the beginning of 1999, there were 1,130 registered farms within the oblast.

Transportation 

Kyiv Oblast has a highly developed rail transport system.  The total length of the oblast's working railway lines is 88 km (as of 1985). Through the territory of the oblast pass the: Moscow—Kyiv—Lviv, Kyiv—Dnipro—Donetsk and other railway routes. In addition to inter-Ukraine and international rail routes, local Elektrychka lines also pass through the oblast: Kyiv—Fastiv—Koziatyn, Kyiv—Fastiv—Myronivka, Kyiv—Teteriv, Kyiv—Nizhyn, and Kyiv—Yahotyn.

The length of the oblast's roads totals 7,760 km, including 7,489 km of paved roads. The main roads passing thorough the oblast include:
 Saint Petersburg—Kyiv—Odessa (M-01/M-05 route)
 Kyiv-Kovel-Lublin (M-07 route)
 Voronezh—Kharkiv-Kyiv-Lviv-Kraków (E-40, M-06/M03 route)
 Luhansk-Dnipro-Kyiv (M-04 route)

The oblast's main airports include two international airports: the Boryspil Airport and the Hostomel (Antonov) Cargo Airport. Ukrainian military airbases are located in the cities of Bila Tserkva and Uzyn.

Strategic gas-pipelines in the oblast include Urengoy–Pomary–Uzhhorod pipeline, and Shebelynka—Poltava—Kyiv.

Education 
Kyiv Oblast has 795 state-run schools of general education, 219 (27.5%) of which are situated in urban areas and 576 (72.5%) of which – in rural areas. These schools are attended by 232,260 students, 141,416 (60.6%) which attend urban schools, and 98,944 (39.4%) which attend rural area schools. In addition, there are 12 evening schools with an enrollment of over 6,000 students, 15 private institutions teaching about 7,000 students, 23 vocational schools teaching over 14,300 students, 22 higher schools with an enrollment of over 34,900 students), and 52 home-school institutions containing over 48,700 children. There are also 756 institutions of pre-school education attended by a total of 44,400 children, 52 home-school institutions, 22 vocational institutions, having an enrollment of 17,300 students.

Also, educational institutions for orphans, physically and mentally disabled children represent an important component of Kyiv Oblast's educational system.

In addition to general education schools, the oblast has educational institutions specifically for gifted children, including:
 Fastiv Regional Natural and Mathematic School
 Kyiv Regional Lyceum of Physical Education and Sports
 Stritiv Higher Pedagogical School of Kobza Music
 Brovary Higher School of Physical Education (training ground for several world- and Olympic champions).

Nomenclature 

Most of Ukraine's oblasts are named after their capital cities, officially referred to as "oblast centers". The name of each oblast is a relative adjective, formed by adding a feminine suffix to the name of respective center city: Kyiv (in transliterated Ukrainian) is the center of the Kyivs’ka oblast (Kyiv Oblast). Most oblasts are also sometimes referred to in a feminine noun form, following the convention of traditional regional place names, ending with the suffix "-shchyna", as is the case with the Kyiv Oblast, Kyivshchyna.

 Notes a.''' 
These neighboring settlements are practically merged into a conurbation

 See also 
 List of villages in Kyiv Oblast
 Subdivisions of Ukraine
 Radomysl Castle

 References 

 Information Card of the Region – Official site of the Cabinet of Ministers of Ukraine

 External links 

 kyiv-obl.gov.ua – Official website of Kyiv Oblast Administration
 patent.net.ua – Symbols of Kyiv Oblast
 Wormwood Forest – a commercial'' site, however, containing free-access Chernobyl-related maps and photogallery 
 Kyiv Oblast from website Ukraine-CityGuide 
Kyiv real estate – a noncommercial site with detailed information on all residential complexes of Kyiv Oblast 
 Kyiv Oblast from website Ukraine-CityGuide 
 The Official Site of the Radomysl Castle 

 
Oblasts of Ukraine
States and territories established in 1932
1932 establishments in Ukraine